Hypermagic Mountain is the fourth studio album by American noise rock band Lightning Bolt, released October 18, 2005.

Background
The band and their sound engineer, Dave Auchenbach, recorded the album in a house in Providence, Rhode Island directly onto a 2 track DAT master tape. The album is a clear continuation of the sound they established on their previous albums, featuring a very dense sound composed almost entirely of distorted, often-processed bass guitar; loud, fast drums; and indiscernible vocals buried in the album's mix. The album's artwork was drawn by Brian Chippendale; the album's title was not decided until after the artwork was finished.

Critical reception

Hypermagic Mountain was met with near-universal acclaim, with an average of 88 out of 100 based on 23 reviews on Metacritic. The same site rates the album at number 145 on the all-time highest rated albums, and as the fifth best album of 2005.
Stylus Magazines Roque Strew hailed the album as "another stride toward the perfection of [Lightning Bolt's] prog-noise esthetic", while Prefix Magazine's Aaron Richter called it Lightning Bolt's "most accomplished effort to date, one-upping 2003’s Wonderful Rainbow with a fresh sense of maturity." Pitchfork'''s Brandon Stosuy similarly described Hypermagic Mountain as the band's "most well-oiled album", but criticized that "somewhere in the middle a lack of variety creates a dull patch." Joe Martin, in CMJ New Music Monthly'', said that the album's "craft-refinement has an exhilaration all of its own".

Track listing

Personnel
Brian Chippendale – drums and vocals
Brian Gibson – bass guitar
Dave Auchenbach – recording engineer

References

External links
 Lightning Bolt official website
 Lightning Bolt at Load Records

2005 albums
Lightning Bolt (band) albums
Load Records albums